Pocket-hole joinery, or pocket-screw joinery, involves drilling a hole at an angle — usually 15 degrees — into one work piece, and then joining it to a second work piece with a self-tapping screw.

Pocket hole machines  
Modern pocket hole machines are capable of routing low-angle pockets - as low as 3 degrees - creating stronger joints by minimizing joint shift.

Pocket hole jigs 
Pocket holes can be formed by drilling a series of holes until a pocket hole is created, but pocket hole jigs make the process much quicker and easier. Pocket hole jigs allow the user to drill a hole at an accurate angle to get a good joint. Using a pocket hole jig also makes for a cleaner and neater appearance as opposed to creating a pocket hole without the help of a jig. A pocket hole jig is generally made of plastic and has a metal insert that the drill bit is inserted through to drill the hole. A jig can be a stationary device that the wooden pieces are clamped into, or a portable device that is clamped onto the wooden pieces.

Technique 
When joining boards at a right angle, it is important that the cuts are precise and square to prevent gaps or un-perpendicular joints between the boards. Some woodworkers lay out their project before drilling their pocket holes and mark the face of the board that they want to drill to ensure the hole is in the correct location. Most pocket joints are made by screwing into the face or the edge of the board rather than the end grain because the screw will grab better.

Pocket hole joint screws 
Self-tapping pocket screws are used for pocket hole joints. Pocket screws are generally more expensive, but they are needed for a tight, strong joint. Pocket screws have a wide washer head to spread the load for a firm bond, and prevent screwing too far into the joint and cracking the wood. The self tapping screws will grip any type of wood, but coarse threads are needed for softer wood and fine threads are needed for harder.

Pocket hole joint screws will vary in length depending on the thicknesses of the 2 pieces of material being joined. This is an important factor in correctly laying out a pocket hole joint, and a common cause for error.

Benefits 
 Because the screws act as internal clamps holding the joint together, glue is unnecessary (but usually recommended) for most common joints.  If glue is used, clamping is not required because of the ‘internal clamps’ holding the joint together while the glue dries.
Gluing and screwing the joints together prevents gaps from forming as wood shrinks and expands with temperature and moisture.
 Requires only one hole to be drilled, eliminating the need to precisely line up mating workpieces, as is required with dowel and mortise and tenon joints.
 Does not require any complex mathematics or measurements, such as those used in mortise and tenon joints.
 Because pocket-hole joinery doesn't require access to the inside of the joint, quick repairs are possible without completely disassembling the joint.

Drawbacks 
 A broken pocket-hole joint "likely can’t be repaired".
 Although the holes can be plugged the pocket hole may be considered unsightly when all sides of the joint are visible. 
 It is not suitable for joining thin pieces of wood - 10-15mm minimum.

Applications

References 

Joinery